Juvenile may refer to:

Juvenile status, or minor (law), prior to adulthood
Juvenile (organism)
Juvenile (rapper) (born 1975), American rapper
Juvenile (2000 film), Japanese film
Juvenile (2017 film)
Juvenile (greyhounds), a greyhound competition
Juvenile particles, a type of volcanic ejecta
A two-year-old horse in horse racing terminology

See also
"The Juvenile", a song by Ace of Base
Juvenile novel
Any of "Heinlein juveniles"
Juvenile delinquency
Juvenilia, works by an author while a youth
Juvenal (disambiguation)